Abhishek Kapoor (born 6 August 1971) is an Indian film director and producer who works in Hindi cinema.

Career
He started his career as an actor in 1996 with movies Aashique Mastane, opposite Monica Bedi, directed by Ajay Kashyap and Uff! Yeh Mohabbat, opposite Twinkle Khanna, directed by Vipin Handa. He made his directorial début with Aryan in 2006 which was a critical and commercial failure.

In 2008, he wrote and directed Rock On!! an Indian Rock musical film starring Farhan Akhtar and Arjun Rampal that won the "National Award for Best Hindi Film" for outstanding artistic contribution towards cinema. The film went on to become a major success, bringing not just accolades but also a Filmfare Award in 2009.

In 2013, "Kai Po Che" (2013) based on Chetan Bhagat's novel, 'The 3 Mistakes of my Life' had its world premiere at the 63rd Berlin Film Festival's World Panorama segment and won the Filmfare Award in 2014 for Best Screenplay. In 2016, he directed and produced Fitoor, an adaptation of Charles Dicken's Great Expectations. Abhishek has launched his production company, Guy in the Sky Pictures.

Personal life
Kapoor is a cousin of the actor Tusshar Kapoor and producer Ekta Kapoor. His mother Madhubala, is the sister of Bollywood actor Jeetendra.

On 4 May 2015, Abhishek married Swedish actress and model Pragya Yadav. They have two children, Isana and Shamsher.

Filmography

Awards and nominations

National Film Awards

Filmfare Awards

IIFA Awards

Screen Awards

References

External links
 

Living people
Hindi-language film directors
Indian male screenwriters
Filmfare Awards winners
1971 births
Film directors from Mumbai
Film producers from Mumbai
21st-century Indian film directors
Fear Factor: Khatron Ke Khiladi participants